Catullus 6 is a Latin poem of seventeen lines in Phalaecean metre by the Roman poet Catullus.

Text

Analysis 
Flavius is rallied about an intrigue which he has in vain tried to conceal. With the general theme, E. T. Merrill compares Catullus 55.1ff. and Horace, Carmina 1.27; 2.4.

In his Victorian translation of Catullus, R. F. Burton titles the poem "To Flavius: Mis-speaking his Mistress".

References

Sources 
 Burton, Richard F.; Smithers, Leonard C., eds. (1894). The Carmina of Caius Valerius Catullus. London: Printed for the Translators: for Private Subscribers. pp. 10–12.
 Merrill, Elmer Truesdell, ed. (1893). Catullus (College Series of Latin Authors). Boston, MA: Ginn and Company. pp. 14–15.

Further reading 

 Uden, James (2005). "Scortum Diligis: A Reading of Catullus 6". The Classical Quarterly, 55(2). pp. 638–642.

External links 
 C. Valerius Catullus. "Catul. 6". Carmina. Leonard C. Smithers, ed. Perseus Digital Library. Retrieved 1 March 2023.

C006
Articles containing video clips